SBI may refer to:

 Sambailo Airport, Guinea (by IATA code)
 SBI Group, a financial services company of Japan
 School of Business Informatics of the Virtual Global University
 Secure Border Initiative, a program in the United States
 Site of Biological Importance, a designation used locally in England for valued sites of biological diversity
 Soldier Boy I, a fictional superhero in The Boys franchise
 Somaliland Beverage Industries, group of companies in Somaliland
 South Bend International Airport, airport serving South Bend, United States, and its surrounding metro area
 Space-Based Interceptor, a project of the Strategic Defense Initiative
 State Bank of India, largest bank of India with a multinational presence
 State bureau of investigation, a state-level detective agency in the United States
 Surabaya Pasar Turi railway station, Surabaya, East Java, Indonesia (station code: SBI)
 Synchronous Backplane Interconnect, a computer bus used by early VAX computers
 North Carolina State Bureau of Investigation

See also 
 SB I
 SSBI